Crane Prairie Reservoir is a man-made lake located about  southwest of Bend in Deschutes County, Oregon, United States. The reservoir is named for the cranes that thrive in its habitat and for the upper Deschutes River prairie that once covered the area before the dam on the Deschutes was constructed in 1922. Eighteen years later, in 1940, the dam was rebuilt by the Bureau of Reclamation. The reservoir now serves as one of Oregon's largest rainbow trout fisheries. The heaviest fish ever caught in the lake was a  trout.

The river leaves the reservoir via the dam and continues south to Wickiup Reservoir.

See also
 List of lakes in Oregon

References

External links

Reservoirs in Oregon
Lakes of Deschutes County, Oregon
Deschutes National Forest
1922 establishments in Oregon